Epic Pinball is a 1993 pinball video game developed by James Schmalz and published by Epic MegaGames. The initial release pre-dated Schmalz' Digital Extremes name. The game is played seen from a 2D top-down view within a scrollable window with plain raster graphics in 320x240. It was noted for being programmed entirely in x86 assembly language for MS-DOS systems. On November 30, 2017 the game was re-released on GOG.com, with support for Microsoft Windows, macOS, and Linux pre-packed with DOSBox.

Tables
The game was originally distributed on floppy disks in 3 separate packs of 4 tables each. The original shareware version (and an early retail version) included only the original "Android" table. Later shareware versions and retail versions contained an updated version called "Super Android" (although it's still referred to as "Android" in the game, the table was changed to say "Super Android")

Another table, "African Safari", was included in the "Full Edition" (the CD-ROM version), in addition to the tables from the three packs above.

Development
Tim Sweeney saw some impressive 3D demos done by a group of Finnish developers that were members of the PC demogroup Future Crew and sent Mark Rein to Finland to recruit them. They declined except for Misko Iho who travelled to the US with Mark, bringing back an unfinished version of a pinball game. Unable to convince them to allow Epic MegaGames to finish the game, Tim showed the unfinished game to James Schmalz in Canada. James developed Epic Pinball (with six pinball tables) from scratch in nine months while he was in college. Tim and Mark kept in touch with James to ensure he was on the right track. The graphics were created using Deluxe Paint II and the music was composed using Scream Tracker.

Releases
In 1993, the first registered game included only the first two pinball packs. The following year, xLand Games distributed that very version under the title "Fliper".

In 1994, the "Crash & Burn", "Jungle Pinball", "Enigma", "Cyborgirl" and "Deep Sea" tables were released as individual games by B&N Software and its child company Strange Ranger.

In 1995, all three packs plus the exclusive "African Safari" were released on CD.

In the mid to late 1990s, individual tables were given away as free floppy diskettes to customers of Blockbuster Video upon renting 2 or more items. The promotion lasted only for a few months.

In 2011, the game was partially re-made by Fuse Powered Inc. for Apple's iPhone, iPod Touch and iPad platforms. The game, re-titled as "Retro Pinball", features updated versions of three tables from the original game.

Reception

Epic Pinball was a major commercial success for its creators, whose internal figures placed it as the third-best-selling shareware product of all time. Designer James Schmalz said in 1999, "Epic Pinball was way more successful than anyone imagined it could be. I went from earning $1200 a month to earning at times almost a hundred times that." According to Epic's Tim Sweeney, it was the publisher's top-selling shareware game ever, and Schmalz earned "more than a million dollars from the shareware royalties" in its first year. Ultimately the game sold more than 200,000 copies.

Computer Gaming World in 1994 stated that Epic Pinball was superior to the development team's commercial Silverball and "overall quality is very high". The magazine concluded that the $45 registration fee was a good value for eight boards, as "Very few commercial alternatives offer as much without causing your wallet to Tilt!"

See also
Silverball
Extreme Pinball

References

External links

List of past games from Digital Extremes

1993 video games
Assembly language software
DOS games
Epic Games games
Games commercially released with DOSBox
Multiplayer and single-player video games
Pinball video games
Video games developed in Canada